James Drummond (24 August 1881–unknown) was a Scottish footballer who played for Bellshill Athletic, Celtic, Manchester City and Partick Thistle.

References

1881 births
Scottish footballers
English Football League players
Association football forwards
Bellshill Athletic F.C. players
Celtic F.C. players
Manchester City F.C. players
Partick Thistle F.C. players
Year of death missing